Vélez-Rubio is a municipality in the province of Almería, in the autonomous community of Andalusia, Spain.

History

There have been people living the region for 30,000 years.  The present location is from the 15th-16th centuries, when Moriscos and Christians came to live in the Fatín area, and expanded the town around the church and the town hall. The greatest development took place during the 18th and 19th centuries, when the straightest and largest streets, and most luxurious buildings were built.

Main sights

Church of the Virgin of the Incarnation, the most important of the province of Almeria.
Ethnographic museum.
The convent of the Immaculate Conception.

Holy week 

Venerable Hermandad de Ntro Padre Jesús Nazareno (Venerable brotherhood of our Father Jesus from Nazareth) known as "the slaves". It  was founded on the 16th century.
Cofradía de la Santa Vera Cruz y Sangre de Cristo (brotherhood of the Jesus' Holy True Cross and Blood) known as "Christ of the Coffin".
Tradicional Hermandad de Ntra Sra de los Dolores (Traditional brotherhood of Our Lady of the Sorrows) known as "the coffees". It was founded on the 19th century.
Cofradía del Santísimo Cristo del Perdón y de los Afligidos (brotherhood of the Holy Christ of the Pardon and Afflicted), known as "the porcelains".

References

External links
  Noticias de la Comarca de Los Vélez- Vélez Rubio
  Municipality of Vélez-Rubio
  Vélez-Rubio - Sistema de Información Multiterritorial de Andalucía
  Vélez-Rubio - Diputación Provincial de Almería
  Portal of businesses and Information in Vélez-Rubio - TODOVELEZ.ES

Municipalities in the Province of Almería